Glen Aubrey is a hamlet (and census-designated place) located in the town of Nanticoke in Broome County, New York, United States. Its population was 485 at the 2010 census.

Geography
Glen Aubrey is located in the southeastern part of the town of Nanticoke. New York State Route 26 passes through the community, leading south  to Endicott (west of Binghamton) and north  to Interstate 81 at Whitney Point.

Glen Aubrey is in the valley of the East Branch of Nanticoke Creek, which flows south to the Susquehanna River.

Demographics

References

Binghamton metropolitan area
Census-designated places in Broome County, New York
Hamlets in Broome County, New York
Hamlets in New York (state)